Kallattumukku is a suburb of Thiruvananthapuram, the capital of Kerala, India. Kallattumukku is situated between Ambalathara, Thiruvananthapuram and Kamaleswaram.

Geography

Location
Kallattumukku is 4 km from the city centre. Privately owned and KSRTC buses plying in the Kovalam route from East Fort pass through Kallattumukku. A bypass of National Highway 47 passes 2 km to the west of Kallattumukku. Nearest railway station is Thiruvananthapuram Central, around 4 km away. Nearest airport is Thiruvananthapuram International Airport, around 5 km away. Kallattumukku is a bustling residential region situated on the way from East Fort to Thiruvallam, in Thiruvananthapuram. The 2000-year-old Sree Parashuram Temple at Thiruvallam is 3 km away from Kallattumukku.

Religion
The population of Kallattumukku mainly practices Islam and Hinduism.

References

External links
 
 

Suburbs of Thiruvananthapuram